Burfoot Park is a public park located in Thurston County, Washington. Burfoot Park covers 50 acres of property with 1,100 feet of saltwater beach frontage on Budd Inlet of the Puget Sound.

Features

The park just north of the City of Olympia covers 50 acres and features picnic shelters, nature trails, a small playground, and public restrooms. There is also a small garden. Rhododendrons dot the miles of trail.

References 

History of Thurston County, Washington
Parks in Thurston County, Washington